Simon Peters Mutum is an Anglican bishop in Nigeria: he is a Missionary bishop within the Anglican Province of Abuja, itself one of 14 provinces within the Church of Nigeria.

He was appointed non-Geographic bishop for "the nomadic mission to thousands of Fulanis who have not heard about Christ" in 2005, having previously been  Bishop of Jalingo.

Notes

Living people
Missionary bishops in the Province of Abuja
21st-century Anglican bishops in Nigeria
Year of birth missing (living people)
Anglican bishops of Jalingo